Warren is a township and unincorporated community in Weber County, Utah, United States. Originally settled in 1870 under the name of Salt Creek, it was renamed in 1896 in honor of Lewis Warren Shurtliff, the local stake president of the Church of Jesus Christ of Latter-day Saints.

References

Unincorporated communities in Utah
Unincorporated communities in Weber County, Utah
1870 establishments in Utah Territory